Logical Progression (also known as LTJ Bukem Presents Logical Progression) is a compilation album spearheaded by the English musician and label head LTJ Bukem, released in 1996. It includes tracks by Bukem and artists who recorded for his label, Good Looking Records, as well as his remixes. 

The compilation was a commercial success. (The New) Rolling Stone Album Guide called it "a landmark drum-and-bass album," and, along with Goldie's Timeless, "perhaps one of the two most important drum-and-bass releases of the decade."

Bukem promoted the album in the United States by playing the Enit Festival.

Critical reception

Eric Weisbard, writing in Spin, called the compilation "the most rhythmically rich drum'n'bass compilation I've heard, whir-whizz shimmer that's less reggae than other jungle, an uncut slice of British trendiness." Rolling Stone wrote: "While Bukem's dense tunes fare slightly better than the anesthetized soundscapes that fill most of Logical Progression, it is tracks like Photek's spooky, claustrophobic 'Pharoah' (which sounds like 'Riders on the Storm' meets 'Cold Sweat' at high speed) and Aquarius and Tayla's oceanic 'Bringing Me Down' that provide the real sustenance."

Newsday determined that "Bukem's songs 'Demon's Theme', 'Music' and 'Horizons' are like signature tunes from another galaxy, but his mix CD, replete with surface noise from the original vinyl, is doomed to attract that most damning of indictments from the uninitiated: that it all sounds the same." The Chicago Tribune concluded that Bukem "charts new territory by orchestrating a psychedelic urban symphony incorporating trance's slow Middle Eastern tonalities, jungle's industrialized West Indian drum roll and a lyrically experimental hip-hop." The Independent deemed the album a "spring-heeled, summer's-coming drum'n'bass selection."

AllMusic wrote that "the house influences and steady rhythms make Logical Progression perhaps the best introduction to jungle for those not used to hyper-speed breakbeats." MusicHound Rock: The Essential Album Guide noted that "Demon's Theme" is "considered a classic."

Track listing

References

1996 compilation albums